Allt Cynhelyg is a semi-natural oak-hazel woodland forming a Site of Special Scientific Interest in Brecknock, Powys, Wales. It has a notable natural population of Meconopsis cambrica (Welsh poppy).

See also
List of Sites of Special Scientific Interest in Brecknock

References 

Sites of Special Scientific Interest in Brecknock